Caroline Wozniacki was the defending champion, but she chose not to participate this year.
Agnieszka Radwańska won the title, defeating Anastasia Pavlyuchenkova in the final, 6-7(6-8), 6-3, 6-4

Seeds

Draw

Finals

Top half

Bottom half

Qualifying

Seeds

Qualifiers

Qualifying draw

First qualifier

Second qualifier

Third qualifier

Fourth qualifier

External links
Main draw
Qualifying draw

2013 Singles
2013 WTA Tour
2013 in South Korean tennis